Morena is an Italian, Portuguese and Spanish feminine given name derived from the term moreno, meaning "brown, brown-haired." It is a popular name in Argentina, where it was the second most popular name given to baby girls born in Córdoba, Argentina in 2009. It is a popular name in South Africa too, mainly among Sotho, Tswana and Pedi speaking people. The name means king or chief and is usually given to boys of regal lineage,it is also used to praise God/Jesus.

People named Morena include:

 Morena Baccarin (born 1979), Brazilian American actress
 Morena Gallizio (born 1974), Italian former alpine skier
 Morena Herrera, Salvadoran feminist and social activist
 Morena Makar (born 1985), Croatian snowboarder

References

Italian feminine given names
Spanish feminine given names